Lady Mary Georgina Filmer (née Cecil, 4 April 1838 – 17 March 1903) was an early proponent of the art of photographic collage.

A Victorian socialite, Lady Filmer produced several albums consisting of watercolour scenes decorated with photomontages. One of her works (from the so-called Filmer Album) depicts a drawing room, painted in watercolour, in which she has added photographic cut-outs from albumen silver prints. She positions herself next to a large figure of the Prince of Wales, with whom she was known to flirt. Her albums and glue pot are set out on a large table beside her. Much smaller, Sir Edmund Filmer, her husband, is seated next to a pet dog. In 2010, the work was included in an exhibition at the Art Institute of Chicago, which traveled to the Metropolitan Museum of Art, titled "Playing With Pictures: The Art of Victorian Photocollage".

References

External links 

 Examples of Mary Georgina Filmer's work from Luminous Lint

Pioneers of photography
1838 births
1903 deaths
British women photographers
19th-century English photographers
19th-century British women artists
Wives of baronets
Collage artists
Women collage artists
Photographers from London
19th-century women photographers